Tullyhaw (which means 'The Territory of Eochaidh', an ancestor of the McGoverns, who lived ) is a Barony in County Cavan in the Republic of Ireland. The area has been in constant occupation since pre-4000 BC. Located in the northwest of the county, it has been referred to as Cavan's panhandle.

In 1579, East Breifne, then part of Connacht, was made a shire. The shire was named County Cavan after Cavan, the area's main town. The administration remained in the control of the local Irish dynasty and subject to the Brehon and Canon Law.

In 1584, Sir John Perrot formed the shire into a county in Ulster. It was  subdivided into seven baronies: 
two of which were assigned to Sir John O'Reilly and
three to other members of the family;
two remaining, possessed by the septs of 
McKiernan Clan and
McGovern (a.k.a. Magauran)
The last one, Tullyhaw, encompassed the mountains bordering on O'Rourke's country, and was left subject to the ancient tenures and exactions of their Irish lord.

Settlements

Civil parishes
Templeport
Ballymagauran
Bawnboy
Swanlinbar is positioned on an important route between the pre-Norman kingdoms of the Connachta and the Ulad. It is dominated by steep mountains shaped during the last Ice Age over 12,000 years ago
Magh Slécht
Tomregan
Ballyconnell
Killinagh
Kinawley (also partly in baronies of Clanawley and Knockninny, both in County Fermanagh)

Towns
Ballyconnell
Blacklion
Swanlinbar

People
 Tigernmas, High King of Ireland; killed at Magh Slécht
 Conall Cernach; killed near Ballyconnell
 Conall Gulban; killed at Magh Slécht
 Dallan Forgaill
 John McGovern VC
 Seán Quinn

References

Baronies of County Cavan